Nicole Neumann (born 31 October 1980, in Buenos Aires) is an Argentine model, businesswoman and television host.

Biography
After her birth Neumann moved with her family to Salzburg, Austria, her father's place of origin. When Neumann was 1 year old her parents divorced and she returned with mother Claudia to her native country where she had a half-sister named Geraldine Conti. Shortly after, they settled in Córdoba, Argentina. They later moved to Belgrano.

Career

Nicole Neumann first worked in a TV advertisement at the age of 4. She became a model at the age of 12, being the youngest model at the time. The press called her "Lolita", after the book by Vladimir Nabokov, and extended it to other young models that would follow. However, the term in Argentina is only used for mainstream young models, and not for child pornography like the term in English. She worked as a model for Pancho Dotto and Roberto Giordano, and internationally at Paris and Milan. She has worked for clothing brands such as Versace and Nina Ricci. She posed nude for the Gente magazine in 2001 with the model Pampita, saying that it benefited both of them. They both had several conflicts in later years.

Personal life

In summer of 2004 she was seen with the model Nacho Herrero on a beach in Punta del Este while she was still dating her manager Matías Liberman shortly after she separated from him and made her engagement official with Nacho Herrero, marrying him but the marriage would last little the couple is separated the following year for her romance with footballer Fabián Cubero. She took part in a photo session with the football players Mariano Pavone, Marcos Angeleri, Leandro Somoza and Fabián Cubero, in 2006.  She started a relation with Fabián Cubero in 2006. She married him two years later. They have three daughters. In May 2017 Fabián Cubero and Nicole Neumann split up and in April 2018 they formalized their divorce after eleven years of marriage.

Television

Movies

Theater

References

1980 births
People from Buenos Aires
Argentine female models
Living people
Argentine people of Austrian descent
21st-century Argentine women
Bailando por un Sueño (Argentine TV series) participants